Ordóñez or Ordoñez is a Spanish surname. Notable people with the surname include:

 Ordóñez (bullfighter family)
 Antonio Ordóñez (1932–1998)
 Cayetano Ordóñez
 Francisco Rivera Ordóñez (born 1974)
 Anderson Ordóñez, Ecuadorian footballer
 Angel Gil-Ordoñez, Spanish conductor
 Bartolomé Ordóñez (1480-1520), Spanish Renaissance sculptor
Diana Ordóñez, also known as LeDania, Cololmbian street artist
 Diego Ordóñez (1903-1990), Spanish sprinter
 Francisco Fernández Ordóñez (1930–1992), Spanish politician who became Minister for Foreign Affairs in the PSOE
 Florian Ordoñez, known by stage name Bigflo, part of the French duo Bigflo and Oli 
 García Ordóñez, Spanish medieval nobleman
 Isidro Ordóñez, Franciscan friar in New Mexico in the 1610s
 Johana Ordóñez (born 1987), Ecuadorian racewalker
 José Batlle y Ordóñez (1856–1929), former president of Uruguay
 Josefa Ordóñez (1728-fl. 1792), Mexican actress and courtesan
 Juan Francisco Ordóñez (born 1961), Dominican musician
 Juvenal Ordoñez (1948-2009), Peruvian politician
 Karl von Ordóñez (1734–1786), Austrian composer
 Lucas Ordóñez (born 1985), Spanish racing driver
 Magglio Ordóñez (born 1974), Venezuelan Major League Baseball right fielder for the Detroit Tigers
 Miguel Ángel Fernández Ordóñez, Spanish politician of the Socialist Worker's Party and governor of the Bank of Spain
 Olivio Ordoñez, known by stage name Oli, part of the French duo Bigflo and Oli 
 Rey Ordóñez (born 1971), Cuban baseball player
 Roberto Ordoñez (born 1985), Ecuadorian footballer
 Salvador Diaz Ordóñez, an officer in the Spanish Army who designed artillery pieces in the late 19th and early 20th Centuries.
 Sancho I Ordóñez (c.895–929), Asturian king of Galicia
 Sancho Ordóñez (count), 11th century Leonese nobleman

See also
 Ordóñez, a settlement in the Unión Department of Argentina

Spanish-language surnames